Spasmo is a 1974 Italian giallo film directed by Umberto Lenzi and starring Robert Hoffmann and Suzy Kendall.

Plot
 
A young couple on their nightly hormonal romp decide to go to the beach, where they first meet a mysterious man who is parked there. After asking for a light, the couple make their way to some nearby ruins, where in the midst of their passion, they discover a hanging woman. Upon investigation, it turns out to be a brutalized mannequin. The mysterious man peels off in his car before they can ask him questions.

Exit couple number two, Christian and a first girlfriend, who also decide the beach is a good place for a little afternoon delight. They too come upon a woman's body - this time face down, just above the surf. However, it turns out she is a real person, who is in fact not dead. Introducing herself as Barbara and not really explaining how she got there, she quickly disappears while Christian is distracted. Despite seemingly being involved with the girl he is there with, Christian cannot seem to get Barbara out of his mind. He finds a flask with the word 'Tucania' written on it. Christian tracks it to a boat with the same name, harbored in a local marina. He and his girlfriend join a party aboard the boat, where they encounter Barbara and her current lover, Alex.

Christian abandons his girlfriend and leaves the party with Barbara, upsetting Alex. They drive through a wooded area, where they see lingerie-clad mannequins hanging. The couple wind up back at Barbara's motel. Christian tells Barbara about a terrible childhood incident with his father, and Barbara explains that Alex is not her boyfriend but more of a provider. After some flirtation, Barbara makes an odd request: Christian must shave his beard before the two have sex; he complies. As Christian shaves in the bathroom, he hears a noise outside. He pokes his head out of the open window and is assaulted by a man with a gun. The man, Tatum, enters the bathroom and threatens Christian. A brief struggle ensues wherein Tatum is shot and killed. Christian leaves the bathroom and tells Barbara everything. Strangely at ease with the concept of a dead man in her room, she convinces Christian that the best thing to do is run. The pair go to a friend's place, a seaside castle and lighthouse.

Christian insists that his brother Fritz can help, but Barbara insists that no one can. The arguing pair are interrupted by squatters Malcolm and Clorinda; the former taunts Christian with a story about a local murder. Believing that information about Tatum's death has reached the news, Christian admits that he is the killer, but Malcolm explains that he was just joking. Confused, Christian retires for the night. Clorinda tells Christian that he knows her, and a possibly hallucinatory rape scene ensues. Christian then goes downstairs to see Barbara. The next day, she is gone. Christian searches her motel room, where there is neither a body nor any weapon, and then heads to the marina where there is no boat and he is followed by an ominous man. Ultimately he goes back to the tower, where he sees Malcolm talking to that same man, Luca. Increasingly going out of his mind, Christian travels to the marina, and finds his boat anchor missing. Christian spends the rest of the day in the tower. That night, he thinks he sees Tatum on the grounds. Making his way down, he discovers Malcolm dead. Christian leaves in a panic, catching a brief glimpse of an arm at the bottom of the well.

Desperate for a safe place, Christian goes to his original girlfriend's apartment. After spending the night there, he is accosted by Tatum, who is very much alive. Tatum forces him to drive to a quarry, revealing along the way that the plan was not supposed to involve killing him - just driving him crazy - but since he is being stubborn about it, he has to die. Attempting to make it look like an accident, Tatum has him drive to the edge of the cliff and exits the car. Quickly turning the tables on Tatum, Christian reverses the car, smacking Tatum with the open door and running him over twice. Realizing that there is a conspiracy against him, Christian switches clothes with Tatum, puts his necklace around Tatum's neck, shoves the dead body in the car, and pushes it off the cliff.

Barbara and Luca arrive to make sure that 'Christian' is dead. As they leave, Christian follows them back to his family's factory, currently being run by his brother Fritz. It is revealed that Tatum was right — the plan was to drive Christian mad so that he has no claim on the family fortune. Barbara reveals that she has fallen for Christian and is sick of both Luca and Fritz because Christian was not supposed to die. But the two men are satisfied, and tell her to just go along with it. Christian wanders the roads, disguising himself as a male prostitute and getting picked up by a female client.

After leaving the factory, Luca and Barbara are planning their getaway. Christian interrupts them and reveals that he knows about the plot. Barbara admits to everything. The two reconcile and make plans to escape. As the pair lovingly make up, Christian begins to see Clorinda's face, his ex-girlfriend's face and the random woman who picked him up for prostitution. He chokes Barbara to death and runs away. Meanwhile, Fritz has investigated the car crash and figures out that it is not Christian's body in the wreckage. Retreating to his mansion, he decides to indulge in some old family movies. As he is watching them, it is revealed that Christian had mental problems as a child, and that his father's lunacy is hereditary. As he hears that, he begins to have flashbacks. It is revealed that Clorinda was the nurse at the psychiatric hospital and that Malcolm was the doctor. Additionally, it is shown that he has killed Clorinda after the potential rape and dumped her in the well, that he killed the ex-girlfriend, the random woman in the car and Barbara. Alex shoots him, fatally wounding him, but Christian manages to run away. As he bleeds out, Christian makes his way back to the beach where he originally found Barbara, and dies.

Fritz wanders home, and makes his way to a closet full of lingerie-clad mannequins, all with puncture marks and other disfigurements. As he slowly makes his way to a particular mannequin, we hear the voice-over again telling us that the insanity is hereditary, as he repeatedly stabs the mannequin, releasing his pent up rage and craziness.

Cast

Production 
Director Umberto Lenzi declared that he had taken the project from Lucio Fulci and had to re-work it drastically. Lenzi stated he received the script from the producer written by Pino Boller, who Lenzi described as "a friend of the producer who just couldn't write. When they gave me the script, I had to re-write almost everything." Lenzi said he had to implement things that would interest an audience, such as the life sized dolls in the film. Lenzi later claimed that the film "was only saved thanks to my direction [...] without me it would have been worthless."

The film was shot near Orbetello, Tuscany.

Release
Spasmo was released in Italy on February 16, 1974. Italian critic and film historian Roberto Curti stated the film "did not do wonders in the box office..." Reportedly, George A. Romero was hired to shoot the additional footage for the American release.

References

Sources

External links
 

1974 films
Giallo films
1970s Italian-language films
Films directed by Umberto Lenzi
Films scored by Ennio Morricone
Mannequins in films
1970s English-language films
1970s Italian films